The Mercier–Hochelaga-Maisonneuve borough council is the local governing body of Mercier–Hochelaga-Maisonneuve, a borough in the City of Montreal. The council consists of five members: the borough mayor (who also serves as a Montreal city councillor) and the city council representatives for each of the borough's four electoral districts.

Mercier–Hochelaga-Maisonneuve is known as a bastion of support for the Vision Montreal party.

Current members

Laurent Blanchard was a member of the borough council until his selection as mayor of Montreal in June 2013.

References

Municipal government of Montreal
Mercier–Hochelaga-Maisonneuve

fr:Conseil d'arrondissement de Mercier–Hochelaga-Maisonneuve